The following is a list of National Collegiate Athletic Association college water polo teams from all divisions that qualified for the NCAA Men's Water Polo Championship since its debut in the 1969–70 school year. The list features the qualified schools along with appearances, years, active streak, debut, last, and best result. From 1969 to 1994, the tournament featured a round of eight-team bracket and a single-elimination format along with consolation. From 1994 to 2012, the tournament consisted of only a four-team bracket with a semifinals, third place, and championship match. Since 2012, the tournament had teams qualifying from the first round to semifinals based on regular season performance and other measures.

References

.Appearances
College Men's
United States